Border is a 2018 Indian, Bhojpuri-language war film directed by Santosh Mishra and produced by Pravesh Lal Yadav under banner of Nirahua Entertainment Pvt Ltd. The stars Dinesh Lal Yadav "Nirahua" in lead role along with Amrapali Dubey. While Awdhesh Mishra, Sanjay Pandey, Sunil Thapa, Subhi Sharma, Vikrant Singh Rajpoot, Seema Singh, Santosh Mishra, Manoj Tiger, Kiran Yadav, Sushil Singh, Vishal Singh, Pravesh Lal Yadav, Maya Yadav, Kajal Yadav, Aditya Ojha, Avinash Dwivedi and Gaurav Jha are in supporting roles.

Plot
Border is the story of Abhay Shastri, how he takes revenge on Pakistan by becoming an army officer. He is a farmer in his village and his elder brother Vijay Shastri is a captain in the army. Abhay falls in love with a Muslim girl Nagma in the village. But Abhay's father Dinanath Shastri does not give his approval for this marriage, which causes Abhay to marry Nagma while rebelling against his family. Captain Vijay Shastri calls Abhay and Nagma to roam the border. Where Abhay and Nagma go to offer chadar at a dargah. The terrorists get the news of this and they call Vijay Shastri and give false news about the attack on the Dargah. Vijay reaches the dargah with the army. Seeing the reduced number of soldiers on the border, the terrorists attack them, and kill everyone. The terrorists capture Arjun Singh and take him to Pakistan. Due to negligence, Vijay Shastri and his teams was court-martialed by the army, whose shock Vijay cannot bear and he commits suicide. The death of his two sons and the kidnapping of one of the son by Pakistan, Abhay's Janaki Maa is shocked and hospitalized. Dr Sahay suggests to Abhay that, due to the death of two sons, they have had in this condition, if their third son comes alive in front of them then it can be cured.

After advice of Dr Sahay, Abhay joins the army after training the army. Seeing his bravery, he is asked by the army to execute the "Mission Border". To complete this mission, Abhay asks the army to include the dismissed commando Amit Singh, Aditya Singh, Abdul Hameed, Vinod Pandey, Rajesh Yadav and Baljit Singh in his team, which the army approves. After preparing, Abhay attacks Pakistan with all soldiers, and brings Arjun with him by killing all the terrorists. In this operation, two soldiers Amit Singh and Abdul Hameed become martyrs. Janaki Maa gets well after seeing her son Arjun and Pandit Deenanath Shastri also accepts Nagma as his daughter-in-law.

Cast
Dinesh Lal Yadav as Abhay Shashtri
Amrapali Dubey as Nagma (Abhay's wife)
 Sanjay Pandey as Dev Dingh
 Sunil Thapa as Hafiz Khan
 Awdhesh Mishra as Indrajeet Singh (Home Minister)
 Gaurav Jha as Rajesh Yadav
 Vikrant Singh Rajpoot as Vinod Pandey
Shubhi Sharma as Vinod's wife
 Maya Yadav as Vinod's mother
 Brijesh Tripathi as Deenanath Shashtri (Abhay's father) 
 Pravesh Lal Yadav as Amit Singh
 Sushil Singh as Karan Singh
 Vijay Lal Yadav as Vijay Shashtri
 Aditya Ojha as Aditya Singh
 Kajal Yadav as Aditya's wife
 Kiran Yadav as Jaanki Maa
 Vishal Singh as Arjun Singh
 Richa Dixit as Nandini
 Avinash Dwivedi as Hameed
 Anshuman Rajpoot as Baljit Singh
Manoj Tiger as Mithai Lal Yadav
 Ananya Mishra as Manpreet (Baljit's love interest) 
 Seema Singh as Aadhey Maa
 Sanjay Verma as Parsadi
 Ashish Shendre as Sharad Kelkar
 Amit Shukla as Belal Khan
 Rajnish Jhanjhi as Masood Miyan
 Santosh Mishra as Teeka Pandey
 Pradeep Sharma as Jumman (Nagma's father) 
 Upashna Vaishnav as Rajiya (Nagma's mother) 
 Lalit Upadhyay as Amit's father

Production

Release
The film was theatrically released on 15 June 2018 on occasion of Eid across all India and gets bumper opening at Box office.

Soundtrack

The soundtrack of "Border" was composed by Rajnish Mishra with lyrics penned by Pyare Lal Yadav (Kavi Ji) and Azad Singh. It was produced under the Nirahua's own music company "Nirahua Music World" label.

See also
Bhojiwood, Indian Bhojpuri language film industry

References

External links
 

2018 films
2010s Bhojpuri-language films